Betti's theorem,  also known as Maxwell–Betti reciprocal work theorem, discovered by Enrico Betti in 1872, states that for a linear elastic structure subject to two sets of forces {Pi} i=1,...,n and {Qj}, j=1,2,...,n, the work done by the set P through the displacements produced by the set Q is equal to the work done by the set Q through the displacements produced by the set P. This theorem has applications in structural engineering where it is used to define influence lines and derive the boundary element method.

Betti's theorem is used in the design of compliant mechanisms by topology optimization approach.

Proof

When the  force system is applied to the structure, the balance between the work performed by the external force system and the strain energy is:

The work-energy balance associated with the  force system is as follows:

Now, consider that with the  force system applied, the  force system is applied subsequently.

Conversely, if we consider the  force system already applied and the  external force system applied subsequently, the work-energy balance will assume the following expression:

If the work-energy balance for the cases where the external force systems are applied in isolation are respectively subtracted from the cases where the force systems are applied simultaneously, we arrive at the following equations:

If the solid body where the force systems are applied is formed by a linear elastic material and if the force systems are such that only infinitesimal strains are observed in the body, then the body's constitutive equation, which may follow Hooke's law, can be expressed in the following manner:

Replacing this result in the previous set of equations leads us to the following result:

If we subtract both equations then we obtain the following result:

Example
For a simple example let m=1 and n=1. Consider a horizontal beam on which two points have been defined: point 1 and point 2. First we apply a vertical force P at point 1 and measure the vertical displacement of point 2, denoted . Betti's reciprocity theorem states that:

See also
 D'Alembert's principle

References

Structural analysis
Continuum mechanics
Physics theorems